Melissa Hasluck (born 1965) is an Australian film producer, director and editor.

Hasluck was born in Perth, Western Australia in 1965 and was educated at Presbyterian Ladies' College and the University of Western Australia. She completed a bachelor of arts degree in French, and lived in Europe before returning to Australia to study film and television at Swinburne University of Technology, Melbourne. She graduated from Swinburne in 1992.

In 1997 Hasluck won a West Australian Screen Award for Emerging Producer for her work on the six-part series Artists Up Front. In 1999, Hasluck was awarded a ScreenWest New Producer Fellowship, which she used to work on projects in Australia and overseas.

Hasluck founded her own production company, Cecile B Deux Mels, and produced the feature film Teesh and Trude in 2002.

Filmography

References

1965 births
Living people
People from Perth, Western Australia
Australian film directors
Australian film producers
University of Western Australia alumni
Swinburne University of Technology alumni